Croc is a 2007 American made-for-television natural horror film produced by RHI Entertainment that premiered in Canada on the video-on-demand channel Movie Central On Demand in July 2007. It aired in the United States on the Sci Fi Channel on November 4, 2007. It is the 6th film in the Maneater Series produced under an agreement with Sci Fi. Filmed in Thailand, the film revolves around the efforts of the owner of a crocodile-farm, an animal welfare agent, and a hunter trying to kill a large saltwater crocodile that has begun killing people in the area.

Plot
The film begins with two dynamite fishermen working only to disturb an enormous saltwater crocodile which the beast attacks, mutilates, and kills both of them.

Jack McQuade runs a crocodile farm in Thailand with the help of his nephew Theo and Jack's sister (and Theo's mother) Allison. A new neighboring resort owned by the Konsong brothers constantly harasses Jack. They want to get Jack shut down because they have buildings on the land and want to steal the rest. The Konsong brothers set animal welfare, bill collectors, and tax collectors on the farm. As animal welfare investigator Evelyn Namwong refuses to shut down the farm, having found only minor violations, she is fired. After the beast eats two teenagers, the Konsongs send goons to break in and release three of the farm's crocodiles. Jack's crocodiles are blamed, and he gets orders to shut down until further notice.

The beast that killed the teens reappears and eats a young boy near the docks. Its filmed by a tourist nearby and identified as a 20-foot saltwater crocodile. Being much, much larger and of a different species than Jack's, his farm's name is cleared, and he is able to reopen. With the beast continuing to snack on the local population, Jack and Evelyn run into Hawkins, a man who has been hunting it for months to get revenge for its many victims. They join forces to find and kill the beast. While they are talking, they hear gunfire and two hunters claiming to have killed the beast, which is actually one of Jack's escaped crocs. They quickly rush over, only to see the real beast kill one of the hunters.

While they hunt the beast, the Konsongs send someone to kill Allison, who paid his taxes and other bills to help him out. The goon tries to run her down but misses. He leaves behind his cell phone, which links him back to Andy Konsong. Andy heads home to warn his brother that their plot has been uncovered, only to find pieces of him floating in a bloodied pool. The beast was in the pool when he was swimming and killed him. Panicked, Andy calls 911 but then gets sick to his stomach. While throwing up in the pool, the beast emerges and kills him.

Allison and Theo follow in a small boat when Evelyn, Jack, Hawkins and the crocodile farm manager go looking for the beast's pit. The beast appears and snatches Allison, much to Theo's horror. Jack and the rest of the team continue searching for the pit underwater while Hawkins and Theo go to search on land. They find the pit and, to their relief, Allison, who is unconscious but still alive. She wakes up to see the beast with its jaws right in front of her head, but it leaves when it hears Jack calling for her. It comes up behind Jack, gets a hold of his foot, and drags him underwater. As it goes down, Hawkins and Theo shoot at it, with Hawkins managing to shoot it in the brain. It dies with Jack's foot still firmly clamped in its mouth and him underwater. Stuck too high to get down to help, Hawkins advises Allison to cut off Jack's leg since they can't get the beast's mouth open. Instead, the park manager uses a bang stick to blast open its mouth, and Jack gets to keep his leg.

Cast
 Michael Madsen as "Croc" Hawkins
 Peter Tuinstra as Jack McQuade
 Sherry Edwards as Evelyn Namawong (Sherry Phungprasert)
 Elizabeth Healey as Allison
 Scott Hazell as Theo
 Jibby Saetang as Cao "Andy" Konsong Jr. (Tawon Saetang)
 Wason Junsook as Cao Konsong Sr.
 Jack Prinya as Detective Sergeant Dang
 Deedee Kumphasee as Chompoo (Duangduean Kumphasee)
 David Asavanond as Som
 Amy Lackgren as Sunee
 Nophand Boonyai as Corporal Leu
 Pim Yensuk as Kanya
 Elizabeth Lackgren as Anoon
 Clyde St. George as Peter
 Suunthara Phumijan as The Mayor
 Surat Pramtong as Admiral
 Maria Lackgren as Konsong's Wife
 Kant Pan as Mr. Phan
 Lalita Chant as Chet
 Sawit Prasertphan as Kama
 Patrice Veasey as Raymond
 Tracey Tongkeow as Liz 
 Rungsak Saenmuangchin as Buddy
 Selina Lo as Chompoo (voice) (uncredited)

Production
In October 2006, RHI Entertainment made a deal with the Sci Fi Channel to produce a series of ten made-for-television natural horror films to air on the network the following year. Dubbed the "Maneater" series by RHI Entertainment, Croc was the fourth film released. Although the agreement called for the films to premiere on SciFi, the first six films in the series actually premiered in Canada on the video on demand channel Movie Central on Demand  in July 2007 due to a pre-licensing agreement.

Distribution
Croc premiered in the United States on the SCI FI channel on November 4, 2007 for the channel's Saturday Night "Movie of the Week" premiere. Genius Products released the film to Region 1 DVD on February 5, 2008. The film was re-released on August 19, 2008 as part of the second volume of the "Maneater Series Collection" sets. The volume also included Eye of the Beast and Grizzly Rage, the fifth and sixth films in the series, respectively. In 2008, RHI Entertainment released the film to the iTunes store for downloading.

See also
 List of killer crocodile films

References

External links
 Official Sonar Entertainment Croc website
 Official Genius Entertainment Croc website
 

2007 television films
2007 horror films
Films about crocodilians
2000s English-language films
Maneater (film series)
American natural horror films
Canadian natural horror films
2000s monster movies
American monster movies
Syfy original films
2007 films
Films directed by Stewart Raffill
Films shot in Thailand
Films set in Thailand
2000s American films
2000s Canadian films